Farming is a 2018 British film written and directed by Adewale Akinnuoye-Agbaje, based on his own childhood. The plot is about a child whose Yorubá parents give him to a white working-class family in London in the 1980s, and who grows up to join a white skinhead gang led by a white supremacist.

The film, which stars Damson Idris, Kate Beckinsale, John Dagleish, Jaime Winstone, Genevieve Nnaji, and Gugu Mbatha-Raw, wrapped production in 2017. It premiered at the 2018 Toronto International Film Festival on 8 September and won the Michael Powell Award at the 2019 Edinburgh Film Festival. The film was released by Lionsgate on 11 October 2019 in the UK and by eOne on 25 October 2019 in the US.

Cast
 Damson Idris as Enitan
 Kate Beckinsale as Ingrid Carpenter
 Adewale Akinnuoye-Agbaje as Femi
 John Dagleish as Levi
 Jaime Winstone as Lynn
 Genevieve Nnaji as Tolu
 Gugu Mbatha-Raw as Ms. Dapo
 Cosmo Jarvis as Jonesy
 Ann Mitchell as Hilda
 Tom Canton as Bomber as
 Theodore Barklem-Biggs as Scum

Release
Farming premiered at the 2018 Toronto International Film Festival on 8 September in the Discovery Section. The film won the Michael Powell Award at the 2019 Edinburgh Film Festival. On 17 September 2018, the film's distribution rights were purchased for several countries and regions: the United Kingdom, France, Benelux, Australia, New Zealand, Latin America, South Korea, China, Greece, Portugal, Serbia, Montenegro, Singapore, the Middle East, and Turkey. Lionsgate UK released the film in the United Kingdom on 11 October 2019, followed by a United States release on 25 October.

Production 
Production visited two Kent locations in Farming. At the first, The Historic Dockyard Chatham, various areas such as at The Joiner’s Shop, House Carpenters Shop, and the rear of The Smithery, Ropery and Anchor Wharf were used. Production also visited a jewellery shop in Gillingham for some further scenes.

Reception
On Metacritic, the film has a weighted average of 51 out of 100, based on 9 critics, indicating "mixed or average reviews". Screen Daily wrote of the film, “Actor turned director Adewale Akinnuoye-Agbaje makes an arresting feature debut with Farming. Told with raw emotion and lurid violence, it transforms elements of his life story into a disturbing, eye-opening coming of age drama.”

See also
List of black films of the 2010s

References

External links

2018 films
Films about racism
Films set in London
Black British films
Hood films
British drama films
Films set in the 1960s
Films scored by Ilan Eshkeri
2010s English-language films
2010s American films
2010s British films